Lene Terp (born 15 April 1973) is a  Danish professional football manager and former player. She is currently the manager of the Faroe Islands women's national football team.
She captained the Danish national team from 1998 until her retirement in 2003.

Club career
Terp began her career with Kolding, moved on to Vejle, then signed for Odense in 1997. She spent a year with Lynn University in 1995 and a year with the professional English club Fulham in 2001–2002.

International career
Terp won 105 caps for Denmark. She was named in the FIFA All-Star team for the 1999 FIFA Women's World Cup.

Personal life
Terp worked as a coach at Michigan University.

References

External links
 
FIFA all-star team
Profile at Michigan Wolverines
Danish Football Union (DBU) statistics

1973 births
Living people
Danish women's footballers
Expatriate women's footballers in England
Denmark women's international footballers
Expatriate women's soccer players in the United States
1995 FIFA Women's World Cup players
Footballers at the 1996 Summer Olympics
Olympic footballers of Denmark
Fulham L.F.C. players
FIFA Century Club
Lynn Fighting Knights women's soccer players
Danish expatriate sportspeople in England
Danish expatriate sportspeople in the United States
Odense Q players
FA Women's National League players
Women's association football defenders
1999 FIFA Women's World Cup players